Mach 1 can refer to:

 Mach number
 The speed of sound

Literature and publications
 M.A.C.H. 1, a comic strip
 MACH-1 (Marvel Comics), a comic book superhero alter-ego of Abner Jenkins
 Mach 1: A Story of Planet Ionus, a novel by Allen Adler

Automotive
 Mach 1 Racing, a former NASCAR team
 Front Row Motorsports, a NASCAR team that ran with the Mach 1 Racing team name in 2004
 Ford Mustang Mach 1, a performance / grand touring (GT) high-end version of the Ford Mustang known for its styling (debuted in 1969)
 Ford Mach I Levacar, a 1959 Ford car, see List of Ford vehicles
 Kawasaki S1 Mach I, motorcycle
 Ducati Mach 1, motorcycle

Other uses
 Mach One, a UK rock band
 Mach I, a space cadet program at the youth camp Aviation Challenge
 Fly Castelluccio Mach 1, a paramotor aircraft

See also

 Mach (disambiguation)
 Machi (disambiguation)